SN 2020jfo was a type II supernova in the Messier 61 galaxy. 2020jfo's light reached Earth on May 6, 2020 with an apparent magnitude of 16.01. It is notable for being one of the first supernovae with independent, multi-instrument data collected before, during, and after the explosion. Large astronomical surveys like Transiting Exoplanet Survey Satellite (TESS) and Pan-STARRS have played a role in data collection before and after these events.

References

Supernova remnants
Supernovae
Astronomical objects discovered in 2020
Virgo (constellation)